Neptunium(V) fluoride or neptunium pentafluoride is a chemical compound of neptunium and fluorine with the formula NpF5.

Synthesis

Neptunium(V) fluoride can be prepared by reacting neptunium(VI) fluoride with  iodine:

From the equation above, iodine pentafluoride is a byproduct.

Properties
Neptunium(V) fluoride thermally decomposes at 318 °C to produce neptunium(IV) fluoride and neptunium(VI) fluoride. Contrary to uranium(V) fluoride, neptunium(V) fluoride does not react with boron trichloride, but it reacts with lithium fluoride in anhydrous HF to produce LiNpF6.

References

Neptunium compounds
Fluorides